Bet365 Group Ltd (commonly known and stylized as bet365 and spoken as "bet three-six-five") is a leading British online gambling company based in the United Kingdom. It was founded by Denise Coates, who remains the majority shareholder and joint-chief executive alongside her brother, John.

Overview
Bet365 is an online gambling company offering sports betting and casino type games.

In addition to the company headquarters in Stoke-on-Trent, Bet365 have further offices in Manchester, Gibraltar, Malta, Bulgaria and Australia. The group employed over 4,000 people as of 2020.

Bet365 is a trading name of Hillside (New Media) Ltd. and operations including payments through the affiliate programme are carried out under that name.

History
Bet365 was founded in 2000 in a portable building in Stoke-on-Trent by Denise Coates. Denise developed a sports betting platform and trading team to launch the business online in March 2001. The business borrowed £15 million from Royal Bank of Scotland against the family's betting shop estate which had been started by Peter Coates in 1974 and had been run by Denise Coates as managing director from 1995. Bet365 sold its betting shop chain in 2005 for £40 million to Coral and paid off its loan to RBS.

Bet365 chairman Peter Coates was also the chairman at Stoke City and in May 2012 Bet365 signed a three-year contract with the club to become shirt sponsors. In April 2016, the company became the new title sponsors for the club's stadium for the next six seasons, replacing fellow local enterprise the Britannia Building Society. In the summer of 2016, Bet365 also signed shirt sponsorship deals with Bulgarian clubs Ludogorets Razgrad and Slavia Sofia for the upcoming two seasons.

Bet365's reported figures (March 2020-21) showed revenues of £2.8 billion and a profit of £470 million before tax.

Denise Coates, joint chief executive, continues to run Bet365 and is the majority shareholder with 50.1% of the shares. Her brother John, joint chief executive, runs the business alongside her, with her father Peter holding the position of chairman.

In the summer of 2019, the largest UK bookmakers and online casino operators William Hill, GVC Holdings, Flutter Entertainment, Stars Group and Bet365 entered into an agreement to transfer funds to combat gambling addiction. They agreed to increase the amount from 0.1% to 1% of gross income in the next five years.

Overseas operations

In 2018, shortly after the U.S. Supreme Court ruling on sports betting allowed U.S. states to regulate sports betting, Bet365 announced plans to launch in the United States starting with the state of New Jersey with a partnership with Hard Rock Hotel and Casino in Atlantic City. The company would later announce in September 2021 that Bet365 will launch in Colorado with a licensing and revenue share deal with Century Casinos. Bet365 opened up operations in Colorado on 6 September 2022.

In April 2022, Bet365 was also launched in Ontario after it was approved by the Alcohol and Gaming Commission of Ontario to conduct sports betting activities in the province following the passing of a new Canadian law that legalized single-game betting.

Awards and achievements
At the eGaming Review Operator Awards 2010 organised by eGaming Review magazine, Bet365 won the "Operator of the Year" award. Bet365 ranked third in The Sunday Times Profit Track 100 league table, which ranks private companies in the UK based on profit growth rate. Bet365 was also ranked as one of the fastest growing privately owned technology, media and telecoms companies in The Sunday Times Tech Track 100 league table.

eGaming Review magazine has ranked Bet365 the number one Internet gaming company in 2010, 2011 and 2012 as part of its annual Power 50 list of the top 50 most influential Internet gaming companies. Denise Coates, founder and joint CEO of Bet365, received a CBE in the 2012 Queen's new year honours list for services to the community and business. In February 2013 Denise Coates was named as one of the 100 most powerful women in the United Kingdom by Woman's Hour at BBC Radio 4.

Controversies

In October 2014, The Guardian newspaper reported that the company had been taking bets from Chinese citizens by using obscure domain names in order to avoid government web censorship.

In 2016, Bet365 was fined $2.75 million AUD by the Australian Competition & Consumer Commission for misleading advertisements which falsely promised "free bets" to customers.

Denise Coates became the highest paid executive in the UK in 2017, awarding herself a salary of £217m. In 2018, her pay packet rose to £265m as the company reported profits up 31% to £660m, prompting criticism from problem gambling charity groups. In January 2019, Bet365 ranked second on The Sunday Times list of the UK's top taxpayers, with the Coates family – Denise, John and Peter – paying an estimated total tax of £156 million, of which £99 million was paid by Denise alone.

Further criticism highlights repeated cases of Bet365 delaying or outright denying payment to winning players. For example, Bet365 was taken to court for refusing to pay over £1 million in winnings to a horse bettor in Northern Ireland in 2017. The company refused a payout of £54,000 to a punter in England in 2016, a case which is still ongoing as of 2017. In Australia, Bet365 froze the account and refused to pay a punter who had won around $200,000 AUD in 2016. These are just some of the most noteworthy instances; several more cases of Bet365 refusing to pay winnings have been reported by gamblers on Internet gambling forums.

Betting is illegal in India, but Bet365 was doing Surrogate advertising, consumer affairs ministry, India, served notices to various television channels and apps for showing betting companies ads and asked to stop Bet365 etc betting platforms ads immediately.

Media

In the UK, the face of Bet365, since 2010, has been actor Ray Winstone.

References

External links

Companies based in Stoke-on-Trent
Online gambling companies of the United Kingdom
Gambling companies established in 2000
Internet properties established in 2000
2000 establishments in the United Kingdom
Online casinos
Coates family